Boudica (also spelt Boadicea, Boudicca, and Boudicea, and Buddug (in Welsh), died ) was a leader of the British Iceni tribe, who led an uprising against the Roman Empire.

The name may also refer to:

 Boadicea and Her Daughters, a 1902 statue in Westminster, London
 Boadicea (film), British historical film
 Boadicea (moth), genus of moths in the family Erebidae
 "Boadicea", a song by Enya, released on her debut album Enya (1987)
 HMS Boadicea, various ships of the Royal Navy
 Boadicea, a passenger ship wrecked off the Irish coast on 30 January 1816 with 190 fatalities
 Boudica (film) or Warrior Queen, 2003 TV film
 G-ACOX Boadicea, the name of a Boulton & Paul P.71A mailplane
 MV Boudicca, a cruise ship